Aburina morosa is a moth of the family Noctuidae. It is found in the Democratic Republic of Congo.

References

Moths described in 1920
Calpinae
Moths of Africa